Bonde das Maravilhas is a Brazilian funk carioca girl group  who gained fame with the music video of "Quadradinho de Oito".

Singles 

Brazilian musical groups
Funk carioca musicians
Brazilian girl groups